Igor Shmakov (1985–2011) was a Russian actor. He appeared in the 2010 film Burnt by the Sun 2.

External links 
 

1985 births
2011 deaths
Russian male actors
Burials in Troyekurovskoye Cemetery